Regional Cycle Route 41 in Suffolk runs from Snape to Bramfield through the Suffolk Coast and Heaths, an Area of Outstanding Natural Beauty.

Links to
 National Cycle Route 1 at Felixstowe and also near Bruisyard
 NCR 51 at Felixstowe
 RCR 42 at Snape

Route

Woodbridge to Felixstowe
Woodbridge | Waldringfield | Kirton | Felixstowe

Felixstowe to Snape
Felixstowe | Felixstowe Ferry | Bawdsey| Hollesley| Orford | Snape

The route from Felixstowe to Snape takes one through the Suffolk Coast and Heaths, an area of outstanding natural beauty.

From Felixstowe head for Felixstowe Ferry, a small hamlet next to the ferry itself. You may now take the Bawdsey Ferry across the River Deben. You next pass Bawdsey Manor where radar was developed and from time to time the  original transmitter block is open to the public. If you can book the ferry it is well worth the effort as it adds interest and saves mileage.

From Orford it is a simple on-road route to Snape and Snape Maltings.  At Snape one can continue on this route to National Cycle Route 1 at Bruisyard or take Regional Route 42 to Minsmere and meet up with National Cycle Route 1 just South of Halesworth.

Snape to Bruisyard

Snape | Sweffling | Bruisyard

References

External links
 OpenStreetMap cycle mapping for route 41 area
 Tourist Information from Visit Suffolk' about cyclings along the coast
 Discover Suffolk Coast and heaths
 Get Cycling in Suffolk
 Map from Sustrans

Cycleways in England
Transport in Suffolk